In human anatomy the part of the nose which forms the lateral wall is curved to correspond with the ala of the nose; it is oval and flattened, narrow behind, where it is connected with the frontal process of the maxilla by a tough fibrous membrane, in which are found three or four small nasal cartilages the minor alar cartilages, also referred to as lesser alar or sesamoid cartilages or accessory cartilages.

References

Nose